The following is a list of episodes of the Colombian telenovela Pa' quererte, which premiered on 20 January 2020 on RCN Televisión and ended its first season on 23 March 2020 due to the COVID-19 pandemic in Colombia. On 12 January 2021, the new episodes were resumed with the broadcast of a second season.

Series overview

Episodes

Season 1 (2020)

Season 2 (2021)

References 

Pa' quererte